Ludovico Barassi (1873 – 1956) was an Italian jurist and one of Italy's leading authorities on civil law in the first half of the 20th century.

After studies in Pavia and Berlin, he assumed a professorship in Perugia in 1900 and later in Genoa, which he left for Pavia in 1917 and finally Milan's Università Cattolica del Sacro Cuore in 1924.

His principal works include the civil law textbook Istituzioni di diritto civile (1924), used by generations of Italian students, and Il contratto di lavoro nel diritto civile italiano (1901), which established the scientific discipline of labour law in Italy.

References
 

1873 births
1956 deaths
20th-century jurists
20th-century Italian jurists
Italian jurists
University of Pavia alumni
Academic staff of the University of Perugia